Amateur boxing is a variant of boxing practiced at the collegiate level, at the Olympic Games, Pan American Games and Commonwealth Games, as well as many associations.

Amateur boxing bouts are short in duration, comprising three rounds of three minutes in men, and four rounds of two minutes in women, each with a one-minute interval between rounds. Men's senior bouts changed in format from four two-minute rounds to three three-minute rounds on January 1, 2009. This type of competition prizes point-scoring blows, based on number of clean punches landed, rather than physical power. Also, this short format allows tournaments to feature several bouts over several days, unlike professional boxing, where fighters rest several months between bouts.

A referee monitors the fight to ensure that competitors use only legal blows (a belt worn over the torso represents the lower limit of punches – any boxer repeatedly landing "low blows" is disqualified). Referees also ensure that the boxers do not use holding tactics to prevent the opponent from punching (if this occurs, the referee separates the opponents and orders them to continue boxing. Repeated holding can result in a boxer being penalized, or ultimately, disqualified). Referees have to stop the bout if a boxer is seriously injured, or if one boxer is significantly dominating the other.

Nowadays, amateur boxing is sometimes called Olympic-style boxing (now an official term) though this is not to be confused with Olympic boxing. Olympic boxing, while definitely a part of amateur boxing, could be seen as on the verge of amateur and professional boxing, with the Olympians often being compared to top-ranked professionals in terms of skills, and as a rule receiving a quick start in world professional rankings for granted upon turning pro.

History

Early beginnings
Amateur boxing emerged as a sport during the mid-to-late 19th century, partly as a result of the moral controversies surrounding professional prize-fighting. Originally lampooned as an effort by upper and middle-class gentlemen to co-opt a traditionally working class sport, the safer, "scientific" style of boxing found favoured in schools, universities and in the armed forces, although the champions still usually came from among the urban poor.

Development

The Queensberry Amateur Championships continued from 1867 to 1885, and so, unlike their professional counterparts, amateur boxers did not deviate from using gloves once the Queensberry Rules had been published. In England, the Amateur Boxing Association (A.B.A.) was formed in 1880 when twelve clubs affiliated. It held its first championships the following year. Four weight classes were contested: Featherweight (9 stone), Lightweight (10 stone), Middleweight (11 stone, 4 pounds) and Heavyweight (no limit). (A stone is equal to 14 pounds.) By 1902, American boxers were contesting the titles in the A.B.A. Championships, which, therefore, took on an international complexion. By 1924, the A.B.A. had 105 clubs in affiliation.

Boxing first appeared at the Olympic Games in 1904 and, apart from the Games of 1912, has always been part of them. From 1904 to 2020, the United States and Cuba won the most gold medals; 50 for the U.S. (117 overall) and 41 (78 overall) for Cuba. Internationally, amateur boxing spread steadily throughout the first half of the 20th century, but when the first international body, the Fédération Internationale de Boxe Olympique (International Olympic Boxing Federation) was formed in Paris in 1920, there were only five member nations.

In 1946, however, when the International Amateur Boxing Association (A.I.B.A.) was formed in London, twenty-four nations from five continents were represented, and the A.I.B.A. has continued to be the official world federation of amateur boxing ever since. The first World Amateur Boxing Championships were staged in 1974, prior to that only regional championships took place, the only worldwide event apart from the Olympics were World Military Boxing Championships first conducted in 1947 and ever since by the CISM.

Results

The results of amateur boxing match-ups are usually registered, protocolled, and published in a local, regional, national or international press, and broadcast by various media (depending on type, level and importance of the match, and athletes participating,) from the largest international media Associated Press, United Press International, Reuters, covering the major international events, to bulletin-board-type of newspapers covering local events.

Bouts which end this way may be noted in English or in French (which was the AIBA official language.) Amateur boxing does not recognize terms "knockout", and "technical knockout", instead it use the following euphemisms:

All wins, losses, or mismatches except for those achieved by way of a clean knockout, or in absentia, are disputable, and could be contested legally through an appeal to the governing bodies.

Scoring

Amateur boxing to this day have several scoring systems, depending on the tournament regulations and sanctioning authority. Several archaic score systems, that survived to the 1980s (and in some places to this day,) the first of which is a 3-point system, which gave one point for each of three rounds (therefore 3–0 stands for a clean victory by points, 2–1 means that defeated opponent dominated one round, 1–1–1 stands for a draw or ex aequo, which was a very rare occurrence.) It coexisted for a long time with 3-vote decision system, and 5-vote decision system, which resembled professional boxing decision-making system, it took five judges voting either for victory or a draw (in the 5-vote system, 5–0 stands for unanimous decision, 4–1 for majority decision, 3–2 for split decision, 3–1–1 for split decision and one judge ruled a draw. In the 3-vote system, 3–0 stands for unanimous decision, 2–1 for split decision, 0–0–3 for a  draw, with no majority decision option.) Depending on the tournament regulations an extra round or rounds could be appointed on the sudden death principle if there was no clear winner. All mentioned systems were practised in combination with each other (i.e. judges were supposed not only to pick up a winner, but also to fill-in scorecards,) creating complexity with points, scorecards, etc. Tournaments and championships usually employed the 5-vote system. International duals usually employed the 3-vote system, with two judges represented the guest nation, and one judge represented the host nation. Both systems lead to a number of controversial and officially contested results, as punch statistics (thrown-to-landed) mostly wasn't accounted for by either one. At the 1960 Rome Olympics preliminaries, after Soviet Oleg Grigoryev was controversially ruled a winner over Great Britain's Francis Taylor, the IOC decided to relieve some 15 of the referees and judges of their duties before the quarterfinals. After the 1988 Seoul Olympics controversy, when the clearly dominant finalist Roy Jones Jr. of the U.S. (whom even the Soviet judges ruled to be a winner, let alone the commentators and his beaten opponent, who himself apologized for the injustice) was virtually robbed of the gold medal, a new system was created and implemented, where only clean punches score, though a controversy still exist as to what is a clean punch in one's personal opinion, leading to another dubious results. The semifinals of the 1996 Atlanta Olympics proved the new points system susceptible to controversy as well, when Kazakhstani Vassiliy Jirov was pronounced a 15–9 score winner over U.S. Antonio Tarver, with many observers were left confused, believing Tarver was dominant through the entire bout.

Computer scoring was introduced to the Olympics in 1992. Each of the five judges had a keypad with a red and a blue button. The judges pressed a button for which ever corner they felt landed a scoring blow. Three out of the five judges had to press the button for the same boxer within a one-second window in order for the point to score. A legal scoring blow was that which is landed cleanly with the knuckle surface of the glove, within the scoring area from the middle of the head, down the sides and between the hips through the belly button.

The AIBA introduced a new scoring system in January 2011. Each judge gives an individual score for each boxer. The score given to each boxer would be taken from 3 out of 5 judges either by similar score or trimmed mean. Scores are no longer tracked in real time and are instead given at the end of each round.

On March 13, 2013, the computer scoring system was abandoned, with amateur boxing instead using the ten point must system, similar to professional boxing.

Awards

Amateur boxing awards system in essence duplicates the Olympic awards system with minor differences:
  Winner of the final round receives gold medal (1st place)
  Other finalist receives silver medal (2nd place)
  Semifinalists, who didn't qualify for the finals, receive bronze medal (3rd place)
 In some tournaments, where only one third place available (instead of usual two,) or where semifinals produce more than two bronze claimants, 3rd place bouts constitute a separate round.

The United States tournaments and championships, contrary to European equivalent, usually do not award silver medals and bronze medals for 2nd and 3rd place respectively, as they acknowledge only the winners. Hence its colloquial name "Golden Gloves" (implying the winner takes all principle, which they are based upon.) This is a parallel to professional boxing, which also doesn't use such terms as "second place" or "third place", it accepts only "champion" and "challenger".

Protective equipment
In March 2016, protective headgear that had been in use since 1982 was removed from men's competition due to higher concussion rates occurring in fights using headgear than in fights without the headgear. Women's competition was unaffected, as the AIBA announced that there wasn't enough data on its effects on women. This ruling was in place at the 2016 Summer Olympics.

Professional admittance
On several occasions in the 1990s, professional boxers, mostly from the post-Soviet states, resumed their amateur careers, namely: Nikolay Kulpin and Oleg Maskaev in 1993, Nikolai Valuev in 1994, Ruslan Chagaev in 1998.

In June 2016, professional boxers were admitted in the Olympic Games and other tournaments sanctioned by the AIBA. This was done in part to level the playing field and give all of the athletes the same opportunities government-sponsored boxers from socialist countries and post-Soviet republics have. However, professional organizations strongly opposed that decision.

As it is accustomed to in the West, amateur boxers do not compete at the Olympiads consecutively, they turn pro right after they participated in the Games or in other sporting event of international importance, while boxers from Cuba and certain post-Soviet states, which have professional sports there banned today or had it previously, are state-sponsored and frequently stay on in the amateurs, while being arguably professionals de facto, and compete in multiple Olympics.

Competitions
Contrary to professional boxing, which utilizes lineal system, amateur boxing events are different in principle (although professional and amateur cards could appear much similar to each other).

Types of competition

Championships are usually divided into the following age-limited subcategories:

The following ring-experience-oriented divisions are usually represented at tournaments:

There are also specific types of contest for servicemen and jailed people:

In terms of weight classes contests could be either:

Absolute championships without weight limits completely or in two weight classes (over/under 91 kilogram) took place in socialist countries in the absence of professional boxing, allowing to determine country's undisputed champion regardless of weight (over 91: usually contested by light heavyweights and heavyweights; under 91: contested by middleweights with significant other advantages to compensate the weight disparity.) Competitions other than absolute, always had strict weight regulations, weigh-in procedures, etc.

Governing bodies

Essentially, there are three governing bodies in amateur boxing, which rule internationally:
International Amateur Boxing Association (AIBA,) established 1946, responsible for amateur boxing events in general (with World Boxing Championships and Boxing World Cup being the top of it.) National amateur boxing associations and boxing committees are subjected to its decisions, rules, and regulations. Boxing committees of national amateur sports organizations, though not directly subjected to AIBA, abide by its general rules (three rounds, three-minute rounds, protective equipment, standing eight count, three knockdown rule, etc.) with minor locally imposed regulations.
International Olympic Committee (IOC,) established 1894, responsible for boxing events at the Olympic Games. National Olympic boxing selection committees, which undertook national Olympic qualifying tournaments are subjected to IOC decisions (Olympic box-offs, which ultimately qualify athletes for the Olympic Games, held under the auspices of national olympic committees, while Olympic trials, that precede the box-offs, held by national athletic associations.)
International Military Sports Council (CISM,) established 1948, responsible for boxing events at the Military World Games, and World Military Boxing Championships.

Disbanded governing bodies
International Amateur Boxing Federation (FIBA,) established 1920, the AIBA predecessor, disbanded shortly after the World War II.
International Association for Sports and Physical Culture (SASI,) established 1920, the IOC Communist-twin, which was responsible for boxing events at the International Workers' Olympiads (Socialist equivalent to the Olympics at the times when the socialist countries ignored the Western-hosted Olympiads.) Disbanded in 1946 after the USSR decided to join IOC and AIBA.
International University Sports Federation (FISU,) was responsible for boxing events at the Universiades (discontinued.)
Goodwill Games Organizing Committee (consisting partly of the U.S. and Soviet Sports Committee) was responsible for boxing events at the Goodwill Games.
 The National Collegiate Athletic Association sanctioned collegiate boxing championships of the U.S. from 1948 to 1960

Collegiate-level boxing competitions in the United States are usually regulated by one of two organizations: the National Collegiate Boxing Association (created in 1978) or the United States Intercollegiate Boxing Association (formed in 2012).

National competitions

United States

There are several different amateur sanctioning bodies in the United States, including the National AAU Boxing Committee, Golden Gloves Association of America and United States Amateur Boxing Federation (presently known as USA Boxing.)

The Golden Gloves is an amateur boxing tournament that is fought at both the national level and the regional level. Although the Golden Gloves typically refers to the National Golden Gloves, it can also refer to the Intercity Golden Gloves, the Chicago Golden Gloves, the New York Golden Gloves, and other regional Golden Gloves tournaments. The winners of the regional tournaments fight in a national competition annually.

USA Boxing also sanctions a national tournament to determine who will compete on the United States national boxing team at the Olympic Games (either directly qualifying for the Olympics or through worldwide or regional qualifying tournaments).

Canada
Since 1969, amateur boxing in Canada has been regulated by the Canadian Amateur Boxing Association (Boxing Canada) and the various member provincial associations.

Some of the main tournaments include Provincial Championships, Golden Gloves, Silver Gloves, Emerald Gloves and Buckskin Gloves.

Current World & Olympic Champions

Men's Youth Division

Celebrity boxing 

The late 1990s and early 2000s saw advent of celebrity boxing matches, when certain media celebrities, usually Internet and TV personalities, YouTubers, etc., challenged one another. The latest of such matches was the KSI vs. Logan Paul, a white-collar amateur boxing match between the British YouTuber, Olajide "JJ" Olatunji (known online as KSI), and American YouTuber, Logan Paul. The fight was promoted as "the biggest internet event in history" and "the biggest amateur boxing match in history". With the result being a draw, KSI retained the Youtube championship belt he got from the KSI vs. Joe Weller fight which he won in the way of TKO 1m 30 sec into the 3rd round. The belt was presented to KSI by professional boxer Derek Chisora at the end of his fight with Weller. The YouTube championship belt is of red colour with gold motifs. Its design features an eagle with its wings fully spread atop a golden globe with a crown at its centre. The rematch took place on 9 November 2019 at the Staples Center, Los Angeles, this time as a professional boxing match. KSI won the rematch by split decision after going the full distance of six three minute rounds.

See also

Professional boxing

References

External links
Encyclopædia Britannica Article on Boxing and Weight Divisions
Amateur Boxing Records Database
Amateur Boxing Association of England

 

Combat sports
Individual sports